Saliagos is an islet in the Greek island group of Cyclades. It is the first early farming site and one of the oldest settlements of the Cycladic culture.  Saliagos is only 110 to 70 meters in size and is situated between Antiparos (ancient Oliaros) and Paros, along with several other uninhabited islands.

The settlement is dated to the middle to late Neolithic period. Radiocarbon dating has indicated a period from 5000 to 4500 BC. The site was excavated during the years 1964-65 by John Davies Evans and Colin Renfrew from the British School at Athens.

References

External links

Cycladic civilization
Bronze Age sites in Greece
Archaeological sites on the Aegean Islands
Antiparos